Central African Republic competed at the 2019 African Games held from 19 to 31 August 2019 in Rabat, Morocco. In total, athletes representing the country won one medal: Gildas Bangana won the bronze medal in the men's super lightweight boxing event. The country finished last in the medal table, in 41st place, shared with Cape Verde.

Medal summary

Medal table 

|  style="text-align:left; width:78%; vertical-align:top;"|

|  style="text-align:left; width:22%; vertical-align:top;"|

Athletics 

Two athletes represented Central African Republic in athletics.

Francky-Edgard Mbotto competed in the men's 800 metres event. He competed in one of the heats and did not finish.

Jemina Robinei was scheduled to compete in the women's 100 metres and women's 200 metres events but she did not start in either event.

Boxing 

Four athletes were scheduled to compete in boxing: Gildas Bangana (men's 63kg), Davy Bogba (men's 69kg), Amondine Ndarata (women's 57kg) and Nadege Niambongui (women's 60kg).

Bogba did not compete in his event.

Bangana won the bronze medal in the men's super lightweight (63kg) event.

Ndarata lost her match against Jalia Nali (representing Uganda).

Niambongui was disqualified in her match against Deedra Arvella Chestnut (representing Sierra Leone).

Chess 

Four chess players competed: Kourakoumba Florent Desire, Koualet Bebondji Vainney Archeveque, Gamba Merveille Gloria Dan and Daher Khater Rochana.

Judo 

Two athletes represented Central African Republic in judo: Hardi Malot and Loric Syssa-Magale Lagarrigue.

Swimming 

Chloe Sauvourel was the only swimmer to represent the country in the sport.

Taekwondo 

Sadia Kembi (women's –46 kg), Philippe Balanga (men's –74 kg) and Jefferson Gbafio (men's –87 kg) competed in Taekwondo.

Wrestling 

Mansour Idriss was scheduled to compete in the men's freestyle 74 kg event but he did not compete in the event.

References 

Nations at the 2019 African Games
2019
African Games